The following lists events that happened during 1977 in Rhodesia.

Incumbents
 President: John Wrathall
 Prime Minister: Ian Smith

Events

February
 6 February – Seven white Catholic missionaries killed by guerillas at St. Paul's Mission, Musami.
 24 February – Catholic Bishop of Umtali Donal Lamont had a 10-year prison sentence reduced to 4 by the Appeal Court in Salisbury. 3 of the 4 years were suspended. He was convicted in 1976 of failing to report the presence of terrorists

April
 23 April – Robert Mugabe, Zimbabwe African National Union (ZANU) leader announces that ZANU and Zimbabwe African People's Union (ZAPU) are to merge as the Zimbabwe African National Union - Patriotic Front

August
 6 August – The Salisbury Woolworths bombing. A 30 kg bomb exploded in a Woolworths store in Salisbury killing 11 people and wounding 76. The victims were black, white and coloured. The store on the corner of Pioneer Street, and Bank Street was also badly damaged.

November
23–25 November – 3,000 ZANLA guerillas killed in raids by Rhodesian Security Forces on camps in Mozambique. These raids were code named Operation Dingo, also known as the Chimoio Raids and the Chimoio massacre.

Births

Deaths
9 August – Johanna Decker, a missionary killed by guerillas.

References

 
Years of the 20th century in Zimbabwe
Zimbabwe